Luke Smith (born 30 August 1990 in Jakarta, Indonesia) is an Australian professional volleyballer.

Smith was born in Jakarta to an Indonesian mother and English father, before moving to Albany, Western Australia, where he spent much of his early life. His family moved to Norway, before settling in the suburb of Rossmoyne near Perth.

He started playing volleyball in grade 10 at Aquinas College in Salter Point. He since spent time on a scholarship at the Australian Institute of Sport (AIS) in Canberra, and spent two years playing semi-professionally for Linkoping Volleyball Club in Linkoping, Sweden. Whilst at the AIS he played in the 2008 Youth and 2010 Junior Asian Championships.

He made his debut for the Australian national volleyball team in 2011 against Thailand at the age of 20. He represented Australia at the 2012 Summer Olympics in London.

From January 2019, he signed a contract with Polish club Cuprum Lubin.

Sporting achievements

Clubs 
Swedish Championship:
  2012
Finnish Championship:
  2017
  2016
Portuguese Championship:
  2018

References

External links
 profile at PlusLiga.pl
 profile at LegaVolley.it
 profile at Volleyball-Movies.net
 profile at Volleyball.World
 profile at TVF-Web.DataProject.com

1990 births
Living people
Australian men's volleyball players
Volleyball players at the 2012 Summer Olympics
Olympic volleyball players of Australia
Australian people of English descent
Australian people of Indonesian descent
Indonesian emigrants to Australia
People educated at Aquinas College, Perth
Sportspeople from Jakarta
Cuprum Lubin players